The 2018 PDC Pro Tour was a series of non-televised darts tournaments organised by the Professional Darts Corporation (PDC). Players Championships, UK Open Qualifiers and European Tour events are the events that make up the Pro Tour. In this year there are 41 PDC Pro Tour events being held – 22 Players Championships, six UK Open Qualifiers and 13 European Tour events.

This page also includes results from the PDC’s affiliated tours including the Development and Challenge Tours and all the regional tours as well as the results from the World Championship regional qualifiers.

Prize money
The prize money for the UK Open Qualifiers and Players Championship and European Tour events stayed the same as 2017.

This is how the prize money is divided:

PDC Tour Card
128 players are granted Tour Cards, which enables them to participate in all Players Championships, UK Open Qualifiers and European Tour events.

Tour cards

The 2018 Tour Cards are awarded to:
 (64) The top 64 players from the PDC Order of Merit after the 2018 World Championship. 
  resigned his card, and therefore,  moved into the top 64.
 (24) 24 qualifiers from 2017 Q-School not ranked in the top 64 of the PDC Order of Merit following the World Championship.
 (2) Two highest qualifiers from 2016 Challenge Tour ( and ).
 (2) Two highest qualifiers from 2016 Development Tour ( and ).
 (2) Two highest qualifiers from 2017 Challenge Tour ( and ).
 (2) Two highest qualifiers from 2017 Development Tour ( and ).
 (12) The 12 qualifiers from the 2018 Qualifying Schools.
Afterwards, the playing field will be complemented by the highest qualified players from the Q School Order of Merit until the maximum number of 128 Pro Tour Card players had been reached. In 2018, that means that a total of 21 players will qualify this way.

Q-School
In a change to previous years, The PDC Pro Tour Qualifying School (or Q-School) was split into a UK and European Q-School. Players that are not from Europe can choose which Q-School they want to compete in.

The UK Q-School took place at the Robin Park Arena in Wigan from 18–21 January.
The European Q-School took place at the Halle 39 in Hildesheim from 18–21 January.

The following players won two-year tour cards on each of the days played:

An Order of Merit was also created for each Q School. For every win after the first full round (without byes) the players get awarded 1 point.

To complete the field of 128 Tour Card Holders, places were allocated down the final Qualifying School Order of Merits in proportion to the number of entrants. The following players picked up Tour Cards as a result:

UK Q-School Order of Merit

European Q-School Order of Merit

UK Open Qualifiers
This would turn out to be the last year in which qualifiers for the UK Open would take place, as from the 2019 UK Open, all Tour Card holders would automatically qualify for the tournament.

Players Championships
As with 2017, there were 22 Players Championship events.

European Tour

PDC Challenge Tour
As with the previous year, the 2018 PDC Challenge Tour series consisted of 20 events, held over 5 weekends.

PDC Development Tour
As with the previous year, the 2018 PDC Development Tour series consisted of 20 events, held over 5 weekends.

Professional Darts Corporation Nordic & Baltic
The PDCNB replaced the events in Norway and Latvia with new events in Lithuania and Iceland in 2018. As with 2017, there were 10 events held over 5 weekends. Two players from the Tour earned a 2019 PDC World Darts Championship spot, Darius Labanauskas and Daniel Larsson.

Professional Darts Corporation Asia
The PDC introduced the PDC Asian Tour in 2018, with 12 events held over 6 weekends. Five players from the Tour earned a 2019 PDC World Darts Championship spot after Seigo Asada won the Japanese Qualifier. The other players to qualify were Lourence Ilagan, Royden Lam, Noel Malicdem and Paul Lim.

Dartplayers Australia (DPA) Pro Tour
The leading player of the 18 tournaments on the 2018 DPA Tour series qualified for the 2019 PDC World Darts Championship.

Euroasian Darts Corporation (EADC) Pro Tour
There were 6 EADC Pro Tour events in 2018. Players from Armenia, Azerbaijan, Belarus, Georgia, Kazakhstan, Kyrgyzstan, Moldova, Russia, Tajikistan, Turkmenistan, Uzbekistan and Ukraine are eligible to play.

Championship Darts Circuit Pro Tour
The top American and Canadian players over the 2018 CDC Tour qualified for the 2019 PDC World Darts Championship. Chuck Puleo and Jim Long took the two places.

World Championship International Qualifiers

References

 
PDC Pro Tour
2018 in darts